Crocus oreocreticus  is a species of flowering plant in the genus Crocus of the family Iridaceae. It is a cormous perennial native to central and eastern Kriti (Crete).

References

oreocreticus